Tentax minima is a moth of the family Erebidae first described by George Hampson in 1926. It is found in Indonesia (Sumbawa).

The wingspan is about 7 mm. The forewings are light grey brown, with dark-brown subterminal and terminal areas, including the fringes. There is a blackish-grey quadrangular patch at the upper area. The costa is basally black, subapically with small, weak, black dots. The crosslines are weakly defined. The subterminal line is weak and light brown and the terminal line is weakly indicated by black interveinal dots. The hindwings are grey with an indistinct discal spot. The underside of the forewings is unicolorous grey brown and the underside of the hindwings is grey with a discal spot.

References

Micronoctuini